Alcona Community Schools is a school district headquartered in Gustin Township, Michigan.

In 2000 the district was experimenting with university preparatory classes for high school students.

Schools
The schools are Alcona Elementary School (K-6) and Alcona Community High School (7-12). The schools share the same campus, located along Barlow Road, south of Lincoln.

References

External links

 Alcona Community Schools

School districts in Michigan
Education in Alcona County, Michigan